While She Was Out is a 2008 American thriller film starring Kim Basinger and Lukas Haas.  Basinger plays a suburban housewife who is forced to fend for herself when she becomes stranded in a desolate forest with four murderous thugs.  It was written and directed by film producer Susan Montford based on a short story by Edward Bryant which was originally an episode of the TV series The Hidden Room in 1993. The film was produced by Mary Aloe and Don Murphy. Its executive producers included Guillermo del Toro and Basinger. The film was shot in 2006 and had a very limited release in 5 theaters in Texas during 2008.

Plot
On Christmas Eve, suburban housewife Della Myers gets into an argument with her abusive husband Kenneth. After putting her two children to bed, she drives to the mall to buy some wrapping paper and cards.  At the mall, she can't find a parking space for a while and angrily leaves a note on the windshield of a car that is parked using up two parking spaces. She leaves the store as the mall is closing, and the parking lot is nearly deserted. She notices the note is gone from the 'offending' car. As she enters her own car, the car on which she had left the note pulls up behind her.

She confronts the car, and four young men emerge—Huey, Vingh, and Tomás—led by Chuckie. They threaten to rape her. Della insults Chuckie, and a security guard intervenes, but he is shot dead by Chuckie. As the gang realizes that they have committed a murder, Della manages to start her car and drive away. They follow her, intending to kill her, as she is the only witness. As they pursue her some distance, she eventually crashes her car in a deserted area where homes are under construction. She takes a road flare and a toolbox out of her car, and hides behind a backhoe.

Della runs through the buildings under construction to hide, as they search for her. After some time, the thugs corner and threaten her by name, as they had found her drivers license in her purse in her car. As they have her open the toolbox, she hits Chuckie with a crescent wrench, and escapes again into some nearby woods. In the process of chasing her, Tomás accidentally steps on Huey, who falls through a construction site and dies from a broken neck.

After some hide and seek in the woods, Della beats and finally kills Tomás with a lug wrench. She flees through a creek, pursued by Chuckie and Vingh. Della sneaks up on Vingh, kills him with a screwdriver, and hides behind a fallen tree. Chuckie tries to persuade Della to give up; he talks about her kids, saying that he is going to pay them a visit. He tells her what he thinks of her, that she lives a boring life she doesn't want, mistreated by her husband. He finds her, touches her, and teases her face. She holds his hand, pulls him down toward her, and kisses him. He draws his weapon as they engage in foreplay. She tells him to stick his boner insider of her, which distracts him. She ignites the road flare and blinds him, takes his weapon, and kills him.

Della returns home. Her husband Kenneth complains that she was out late and is tracking mud throughout the house, but Della ignores him. She goes upstairs to check on her children, whom are both sleeping. The drunk Kenneth asks what she brought him from the mall, and she replies, "Nothing", and points the gun at him.

Cast

Kim Basinger as Della
Lukas Haas as Chuckie
Craig Sheffer as Kenneth
Jamie Starr as Huey
Leonard Wu as Vingh
Luis Chávez as Tomás
Luke Gair as Terri
Erika-Shaye Gair as Tammi
Rachel Hayward as Lynn

Release

Theatrical
The film received a limited U.S. theatrical release via Anchor Bay.

Home media
It was released directly to video in the United Kingdom.

Reception

Critical response
While She Was Out only received a 31% approval rating on Rotten Tomatoes based on 16 reviews.  According to the L.A. Weekly, it is a "surprisingly enjoyable female revenge tale", describing Basinger's performance as "first-rate" despite "a laughably check-listed, multi-culti band of thugs". The New York Observer called it "ultra-feminist fun" with a "spectacular" ending. Ain't It Cool News called Basinger's performance "her best in years".  Bitch magazine dismissed much about the film, saying it "has an ample amount of cheezy genre conventions, problems with pacing, a gaggle of silly villains, huge plot holes and bad production values" but added that it is "really rather fascinating – and notable – as a horror/thriller that actually gives a damn about the female character it puts in harm's way." The L.A. Times said it "eschews all plot and character development for the hackneyed action scenes and grade-Z dialogue", and Filmcritic.com's review said that its "dialogue is somewhere between kindergarten and film school."

See also
 List of Christmas films

References

External links

2008 films
2008 crime thriller films
American independent films
American Christmas films
American films about revenge
Films shot in Vancouver
Films scored by Paul Haslinger
2008 directorial debut films
American crime thriller films
2008 independent films
Films produced by Don Murphy
2000s English-language films
2000s American films